Motala Church is situated in central Motala, in the province of Östergötland, Sweden. The oldest parts of the church were built in the 13th century. The present church was built 1772-1774. The tower was added in 1844. 

Engineer Daniel Fraser is buried outside the church.

References

18th-century Church of Sweden church buildings
Östergötland
Buildings and structures in Östergötland County
Churches completed in 1774
Motala
1774 establishments in Sweden